Sunrise Glacier is in the U.S. state of Montana.

See also
 List of glaciers in the United States

References

Glaciers of Missoula County, Montana
Glaciers of Montana